Lovro Cvek (born 6 July 1995) is a Croatian professional footballer who plays as a defensive midfielder for Liga I club CFR Cluj.

Honours

Zorya Luhansk
Ukrainian Cup runner-up : 2020–21

CFR Cluj
Liga I: 2021–22
Supercupa României runner-up: 2022

References

External links
PrvaLiga profile 

1995 births
Living people
Sportspeople from Varaždin
Association football midfielders
Croatian footballers
Croatia youth international footballers
Croatia under-21 international footballers
NK Varaždin players
NK Zavrč players
NK Aluminij players
NK Celje players
FK Senica players
FC Zorya Luhansk players
CFR Cluj players
Second Football League (Croatia) players
Slovenian PrvaLiga players
Slovak Super Liga players
Ukrainian Premier League players
Liga I players
Croatian expatriate footballers
Expatriate footballers in Slovenia
Croatian expatriate sportspeople in Slovenia
Expatriate footballers in Slovakia
Croatian expatriate sportspeople in Slovakia
Expatriate footballers in Ukraine
Croatian expatriate sportspeople in Ukraine
Expatriate footballers in Romania
Croatian expatriate sportspeople in Romania